Blaye-les-Mines is a commune in the Tarn department and Occitanie region of southern France.

The settlement grew up around the home of Gabriel de Solages (1711–1799), who founded the Compagnie minière de Carmaux and a glassworks at his château at Blaye.

See also
Communes of the Tarn department

References

Communes of Tarn (department)